The 2011 Serbia Open (also known as Serbia Open 2011 powered by Telekom Srbija for sponsorship reasons) was a men's tennis tournament played on outdoor clay courts. The third edition of the event, hosted by current Serbian player Novak Djokovic, was part of the ATP World Tour 250 series of the 2011 ATP World Tour. It took place at the Tennis Center Novak complex in Belgrade, Serbia from April 23 through May 1. Sam Querrey was the defending champion.

Entrants

Seeds

 Seedings are based on the rankings of April 18, 2011.

Other entrants
The following players received wildcards into the main draw:
  Fernando González
  Ernests Gulbis
  Dušan Lajović

The following players received special exempts into the main draw:
  Illya Marchenko
  Mischa Zverev

The following players received entry from the qualifying draw:

  Martin Kližan
  Alexander Peya
  Franko Škugor
  Adrian Ungur

Champions

Singles

 Novak Djokovic def.  Feliciano López, 7–6(4), 6–2
It was Djokovic's 5th title of the year and 23rd of his career. It was his 2nd win at Belgrade, also winning in 2009. The win in the final marked Djokovic's 29th consecutive win.

Doubles

 František Čermák /  Filip Polášek def.  Oliver Marach /  Alexander Peya, 7–5, 6–2

External links
Official website

Serbia Open
Serbia Open
2011 in Serbian sport